George Mussallem (January 5, 1908 – April 10, 2007) was an automobile dealer and political figure in British Columbia. He represented Dewdney in the Legislative Assembly of British Columbia from 1966 to 1972 and from 1975 to 1983 as a Social Credit member.

He was born in Winnipeg, Manitoba, the son of Solomon Mussallem and Annie Besytt, both natives of Lebanon. Mussallem moved with his family to Prince Rupert and Vancouver. In 1919, the family settled in Haney. The family business represented Ford and later General Motors. Mussallem also served as president of the Executive Committee for the Boy Scouts in British Columbia. He was married twice: first to Beth Brown in 1934 and then to Grace Cuthbert in 1970. Mussallem received his pilot's license in 1929 and continued to fly until his late 70s. He was defeated when he ran for reelection to the provincial assembly in 1972. Mussallem, who served as whip for the Social Credit Party in the assembly, retired from politics in 1983.

His sister Helen was considered to be considered to be one of the top nurses in the world and served with the World Health Organization to develop nurse training and triage systems. He died in 2007.

References 

1908 births
2007 deaths
British Columbia Social Credit Party MLAs
Politicians from Winnipeg
Canadian people of Lebanese descent